Air Vice Marshal (Retd.) Abdul Karim Khandker, Bir Uttom (born 1930) is a former planning minister of the Government of Bangladesh. He is a retired diplomat and was the Deputy Chief of Staff of the Bangladesh Armed Forces during the Bangladesh Liberation War, He was also the first Chief of Air Staff (Bangladesh) get the appointment immediately after the independence of Bangladesh in 1972.

Early life
Khandker was born in a respected Muslim family of Pabna in 1930 to Khandker Abdul Latif and Arefa Khatun. He completed his matriculation in 1947 and ISC in 1949. He Completed his graduation from PAF College in September 1952 and PSA in 1965 from Pakistan Air Force Staff College.

Career 
Khandker started his service career as GD Pilot in 1951. He served in Fighter Squadron till 1955 and became Flying Instructor. He was at PAF Academy till 1957 as flying instructor.
He served as Flight Commander at Flying Instructors' School till 1958. Later he became Flight Commander at Jet Fighter Conversion Squadron where he served till 1960.

Khandker was Squadron Commander at Pakistan Air Force Academy till 1961. Afterwards, he became Squadron Commander of Jet Fighter Conversion Squadron where he served till 1965. He served as Officer Commanding of Training wing at PAF Academy in 1966. He became PSA in 1965 from Pakistan Air Force Staff College.
A K Khandker was President of PAF Planning Board from 1966 to 1969. Later, he was posted at Dhaka as Second in Command of PAF Base in 1969.

Bangladesh Liberation war
Khandker was posted in the Pakistan Air force Base in Dhaka as Second-in-Command when the Liberation War began in 1971. He defected with Wing Commander M. K. Bashar and several other pilots in May 1971 and reached India. The then Bangladesh Government of Mujibnagar appointed him as the Deputy Chief of Staff of the Bangladesh Armed Forces, and was given the responsibility of operation and also training of the freedom fighters. He closely interacted with the senior officials of the Indian Eastern Command located at Fort William, Kolkata about training strategies for the Freedom Fighters as well as for overall operation. He established the first ever Bangladesh Air Force in Dimapur, Nagaland during the war. The Bangladesh Air Force with its limited manpower and resources of only 09 officers, 57 airmen, and 03 aircraft carried out significant numbers of operation against the Pakistani invaders. He represented Bangladesh in the surrender ceremony of the Pakistani forces to the allied forces on 16 December 1971 at the Racecourse ground. He received the gallantry award of Bir Uttom in 1972 for his luminous role in the Liberation War.

Post liberation war
Sheikh Mujibur Rahman, following the independence, appointed Khandker as the Chief of Air Staff of the reconstituted Air Force. He left a lasting mark in developing the newly constituted Air Force. Within next two years, he assembled a fighter squadron, a helicopter squadron, and 2 radar units to its strength. He served the Bangladesh Air Force as its Chief during the period 1972–1975. Apart from serving the Bangladesh Air Force, he was the first Chairman of the national carrier Bangladesh Biman for the period 1972–1973.

During the tenure of the immediate past Government of 2001–2006, Khandker is credited as the main architect of establishing the "Sector Commanders Forum" by organising Sector and Sub-Sector Commanders of the liberation war that waged strong movement against pro-Jamat and other alleged war criminals. He was awarded the Independence Award for 2011.

Khandker was appointed as the Bangladesh High Commissioner in Australia and served the mission during 1976–1982. Later on, he became the Bangladesh High Commissioner in India for the period 1982–1986. In 1986, he was appointed as Adviser to the President and thereafter he served the nation as the Planning Minister up to 1990. He was elected as a member of parliament in 1998 and 2009 from the Pabna-2 constituency (Sujanagar Upazila). In 2009, he had been inducted as a full cabinet minister and given the charge of the Minister, Ministry of Planning.

Controversy 
In 2014, Khandaker wrote his memoirs "1971 Bhetore Baire" (1971: Inside and Outside) and was praised by historian Sirajul Islam who said that "the book provided a balanced presentation of history and the outline of the war and the interest of different vested groups surrounding the war came up in it." The criticises the role of Awami League leadership during the Liberation saying that the political leadership had failed to play its due role.

However, it drew ire from the ruling Awami League government, for creating "distorting historic facts" the history of the Bangladesh Liberation War, as he wrote in his book that Sheikh Mujibur Rahman ended his 7 March speech with "Joy Pakistan." He further added that Sheikh Mujib did not declare independence from 7 March until his arrest, did not leave any written notes or recorded voice messages and did not go through any predefined directions. According to him,

Khandker also added that, not Ziaur Rahman, but a technician of East Bengal radio station first announced the declaration in radio. Then M. A. Hannan, a politician of Awami League, secondly expressed the announcement. Thirdly, on 27 March, Major Ziaur Rahman, the contemporary commander of the East Bengal Regiment in Chittagong again declared the announcement independence on behalf of Sheikh Mujibur Rahman from Kalurghat Radio station.

An uproar in parliament ensued where Awami League lawmakers demanded that the book must be banned and its copies will be confiscated. They also demanded filing a sedition case against the writer, who is also a sector commander of the liberation war. Awami League lawmaker Sheikh Fazlul Karim Selim said that the book "has distorted historic facts and violated the country's constitution by giving such misleading information on Bangabandhu.""I am in doubt whether he wrote the book by taking huge amount of money from any agency," he added. Mohammed Nasim said "Bangabandhu Sheikh Mujibur Rahman awarded AK Khandaker with the Bir Uttam honours but he (Khandaker) insulted the father of the nation by extending his support to Khondaker Mostaq Ahmad. Prime Minister Sheikh Hasina made him a minister but now he wrote a book against Bangabandhu."

In response, Khandaker resigned from the Sector Commanders Forum. He was then declared a persona non grata in the district of Gazipur and pro-government lawyers demanded withdrawal of all of his titles. As a result of the uproar, he withdrawed that part and some other related parts of the book and also formally apologized to the nation for giving wrong information about Sheikh Mujib on 11 August 2019.

References

External links

1930 births
Living people
Awami League politicians
High Commissioners of Bangladesh to India
High Commissioners of Bangladesh to Australia
Recipients of the Ekushey Padak
Recipients of the Independence Day Award
Bangladesh Air Force air marshals
Chiefs of Air Staff (Bangladesh)
Planning ministers of Bangladesh
7th Jatiya Sangsad members
9th Jatiya Sangsad members
Recipients of the Bir Uttom
Mukti Bahini personnel
Bangladesh Krishak Sramik Awami League central committee members